Haɗejiya (also Haɗeja, previously Biram) is a Hausa town in eastern Jigawa State, northern Nigeria. The population was approximately 105,628 in 2006. Hadejia lies between latitude 12.4506N and longitude 10.0404E. It shared boundary with Kiri Kasama Local Government from the East, Mallam Maɗori Local Government from the North, and Auyo Local Government from the West. The Hadejia Local Government consist of eleven (11) political wards namely: Atafi, Dubantu, Gagulmari, Kasuwar Ƙofa, Kasuwar Kuda, Matsaro, Majema, Rumfa, Sabon Garu, Ƴankoli and Yayari. Inhabitant are dominantly Hausa, Fulani and Kanuri with some other groups such as Tiv, Yoruba, Igbo, Igala etc. The dominant occupation of the inhabitants is crop farming and animal rearing which a considerable percentage, engaged in trading, fishing and services including civil service. The people of Haɗeja are largely Muslims, although some follow indigenous belief systems.  The town lies to the north of the Hadejia River, and is upstream from the Hadejia-Nguru wetlands. Hadejia is an internationally important ecological and sensitive zone.

Hadejia was once known as Biram, and is referred to as one of the "seven true Hausa states" (Hausa Bakwai), because it was ruled by the descendants of the Hausa mythological figure Bayajidda and his second wife, Daurama. By 1810, during the Fulani War, the Hausa rulers of the Hausa Bakwai had all been overcome by the Fulani. Haɗeja had been transformed into an Emirate two years earlier, in 1808. In 1906 Haɗeja resisted British occupation, under the then Emir (Muhammadu Mai-Shahada). Haɗejiya was absorbed into Jigawa State in 1991 from Kano State.

The Haɗeja consist of 4 tertiary institutions namely: Binyaminu Usman Polytechnic Hadejia, School of Nursing Hadejia, National Teachers Institutes Hadejia Study Centre.

Gallery

References

External links
Website of the Hadejia Emirate

Local Government Areas in Jigawa State